Fibroblast growth factor receptor 3 is a protein that in humans is encoded by the FGFR3 gene. FGFR3 has also been designated as CD333 (cluster of differentiation 333). The gene, which is located on chromosome 4, location q16.3, is expressed in tissues such as the cartilage, brain, intestine, and kidneys.

The FGFR3 gene produces various forms of the FGFR3 protein; the location varies depending on the isoform of the FGFR3 protein. Since the different forms are found within different tissues the protein is responsible for multiple growth factor interactions. Gain of function mutations in FGFR3 inhibits chondrocyte proliferation and underlies achondroplasia and hypochondroplasia.

Function 

The protein encoded by this gene is a member of the fibroblast growth factor receptor family, where amino acid sequence is highly conserved between members and throughout evolution. FGFR family members differ from one another in their ligand affinities and tissue distribution. A full-length representative protein would consist of an extracellular region, composed of three immunoglobulin-like domains, a single hydrophobic membrane-spanning segment and a cytoplasmic tyrosine kinase domain. The extracellular portion of the protein interacts with fibroblast growth factors, setting in motion a cascade of downstream signals which ultimately influence cell mitogenesis and differentiation.

This particular family member binds both acidic and basic fibroblast growth factor and plays a role in bone development and maintenance. The FGFR3 protein plays a role in bone growth by regulating ossification. Alternative splicing occurs and additional variants have been described, including those utilizing alternate exon 8 rather than 9, but their full-length nature has not been determined.

Mutations 
Simplification on the mutation 46 XX 4q16.3 (female), 46XY 4q16.3 (male).
Gain of function mutations in this gene can develop dysfunctional proteins "impede cartilage growth and development and affect chondrocyte proliferation and calcification" which can lead to craniosynostosis and multiple types of skeletal dysplasia (osteochondrodysplasia).

In achondroplasia, the FGFR3 gene has a missense mutation at nucleotide 1138 resulting from either a G>A or G>C. This point mutation in the FGFR3 gene causes hydrogen bonds to form between two arginine side chains leading to ligand-independent stabilization of FGFR3 dimers. Overactivity of FGFR3 inhibits chondrocyte proliferation and restricts long bone length.

FGFR3 mutations are also linked with spermatocytic tumor, which occur more frequently in older men.

Disease linkage
Defects in the FGFR3 gene has been associated with several conditions, including craniosynostosis and  seborrheic keratosis.

Bladder cancer

Mutations of FGFR3, FGFR3–TACC3 and FGFR3–BAIAP2L1 fusion proteins are frequently associated with bladder cancer, while some FGFR3 mutations are also associated with a better prognosis.  Hence FGFR3 represents a potential therapeutic target for the treatment of bladder cancer.

Post-translational modification of FGFR3 occur in bladder cancer that do not occur in normal cells and can be targeted by immunotherapeutic antibodies.

Glioblastoma
FGFR3-TACC3 fusions have been identified as the primary mitogenic drivers in a subset of glioblastomas (approximately 4%) and other gliomas and may be associated with slightly improved overall survival. The FGFR3-TACC3 fusion represents a possible therapeutic target in glioblastoma.

Achondroplasia
Achondroplasia is a dominant genetic disorder caused by mutations in FGFR3 that make the resulting protein overactive. Individuals with these mutation have a head size that is larger than normal and are significantly shorter in height. Only a single copy of the mutated FGFR3 gene results in achondroplasia.  It is generally caused by spontaneous mutations in germ cells; roughly 80 percent of the time, parents with children that have this disorder are normal size.

Thanatophoric dysplasia 
Thanatophoric dysplasia is a genetic disorder caused by gain-of-function mutations in FGFR3 that is often fatal during the perinatal period because the child cannot breathe.   There are two types.  TD type I is caused by a stop codon mutation that is located in part of the gene coding for the extracellular domain of the protein. TD type II is a result of a substitution in a Lsy650Glu which is located in the tyrosine kinase area of FGFR3.

Muenke syndrome
Muenke syndrome, a disorder characterized by craniosynostosis, is caused by protein changes on FGFR3. The specific pathogenic variant c.749C>G changes the protein p.Pro250Arg, in turn resulting in this condition. Characteristics of Muenke syndrome include coronal synostosis (usually bilateral), midfacial retrusion, strabismus, hearing loss, and developmental delay. Turribrachycephaly, cloverleaf skull, and frontal bossing are also possible.

As a drug target
FGFR3 inhibitors are in early clinical trials as a cancer treatment, eg. BGJ398 for urothelial carcinoma. The FGFR3 receptor has a tyrosine kinase signaling pathway that is associated with many biological developments embryonically and in tissues.  Studying the tyrosine kinase signaling pathway that FGFR3 displays has played a crucial role in the development of research of several cell activities such as cell proliferation and cellular resistance to anti-cancer medications.

Interactions 

Fibroblast growth factor receptor 3 has been shown to interact with FGF8 and FGF9.

See also 
 Cluster of differentiation
 Fibroblast growth factor receptor

References

Further reading

External links 
 GeneReviews/NIH/NCBI/UW entry on FGFR-Related Craniosynostosis Syndromes
 GeneReviews/NIH/NCBI/UW entry on Muenke Syndrome
 GeneReviews/NIH/NCBI/UW entry on Hypochondroplasia
 
 

Clusters of differentiation
Tyrosine kinase receptors